Antonio degli Agli (died 1477) was a Catholic prelate who served as Bishop of Volterra (1470–1477), Bishop of Fiesole (1467–1470), and Bishop of Dubrovnik (1465–1467).

Biography
On 24 December 1465, Antonio degli Agli was appointed during the papacy of Pope Paul II as Bishop of Dubrovnik.
On 4 May 1467, he was appointed during the papacy of Pope Paul II as Bishop of Fiesole.
On 30 April 1470, he was appointed during the papacy of Pope Paul II as Bishop of Volterra.
He served as Archbishop of Volterra until his death in 1477.

References

External links and additional sources
 (for Chronology of Bishops) 
 (for Chronology of Bishops) 

1477 deaths
Bishops of Dubrovnik
15th-century Italian Roman Catholic bishops
Bishops appointed by Pope Paul II